Takmaran Rural District is a rural district (dehestan) in Sarhad District, Shirvan County, North Khorasan Province, Iran. At the 2006 census, its population was 5,204, in 1,236 families.  The rural district has 14 villages.

References 

Rural Districts of North Khorasan Province
Shirvan County